The 2011 Eurocup Mégane Trophy season was the seventh season of the Renault–supported touring car category, a one-make racing series that is part of the World Series by Renault.

Stefano Comini effectively has won the championship with two rounds (and four races) to go, courtesy of winning all bar one of the previous races of the year. Whilst It would still be possible for Niccolo Nalio to beat him, Nalio would have to win all the remaining races, with Comini not finishing any of them, for this to be the case.

After featuring nine teams during the 2010 season, following the late withdrawal of Brixia Autosport, the grid features nine teams once again in 2011.

Regulation changes

Sporting
 The points system for the 2011 season was changed to reflect the system used by the FIA for World championships. The top ten drivers in each race were awarded points as follows: 25, 18, 15, 12, 10, 8, 6, 4, 2, and 1.

Driver lineup

Driver changes
Changed teams
Dimitri Enjalbert moved to Team Lompech Sport.
Wim Beelen moved to TDS Racing.
Bas Schothorst and Jeroen Schothorst both moved to TDS Racing.

Entering Eurocup Mégane Trophy
Enrico Battera competed for Oregon Team.
Jochen Habets and Michele Faccin drove for Boutsen Energy Racing.
Toni Forne raced for PujolaRacing.
Oliver Freymuth participated for AFK Motorsport.

Team changes
PujolaRacing and AFK Motorsport debuted in the Eurocup Mégane Trophy.

Race calendar and results
The calendar for the 2011 season was announced on 11 October 2010, the day after the end of the 2010 season.| All of the seven rounds formed meetings of the 2011 World Series by Renault season.

Championship standings
 Points for both championships were awarded as follows:

Drivers' Championship

Teams' Championship

Gentleman Drivers' Championship

References

External links
 Renault-Sport official website

Eurocup Megane Trophy
Eurocup Megane Trophy
Eurocup Mégane Trophy seasons